The 1998–99 season was the first season in the history of Northern Spirit (now North West Sydney Spirit). It was also the first season in the National Soccer League. Northern Spirit finished 5th in their National Soccer League season, and were eliminated in the NSL Finals series elimination-final first round by Marconi Fairfield.

Players

Transfers

Transfers in

Transfers out

Competitions

Overview

National Soccer League

League table

Results summary

Results by round

Matches

Finals series

Statistics

Appearances and goals
Players with no appearances not included in the list.

Clean sheets

References

North West Sydney Spirit FC seasons